Anina Bennett is an American writer and comic book editor and producer. Some of the famous works she has been part of are the Boilerplate robot hoax/comic or various Dark Horse Comics she has produced. Anina Bennett is part of the husband-and-wife team with Paul Guinan who have been collaborating in print since 1989. Bennett and  Guinan created Heartbreakers that same year. This series was groundbreaking as it was one of the first to feature clones and a group of female comic book heroes.   She is currently working with Guinan on a historical graphic novel, Aztec Empire.

Early career
Anina Bennett is from Chicago and started her career working as an editor for multiple titles for First Comics and Dark Horse Comics. She married Paul Guinan in 1991 and moved with him to Portland, Oregon.

Boilerplate
Paul Guinan and Anina Bennett's most famous work is probably Boilerplate a series about a fictional robot which would have existed in the Victorian era and early 20th century. Originally featured on a website created by Guinan in 2000, Boilerplate details the history of a remarkable robot built in the late 19th century, and features photoshopped "archival images." In reality, the robot is actually a  articulated model which was seen interacting with historical figures, such as Teddy Roosevelt and Pancho Villa, the famous Mexican bandit that invaded America during the Battle of Columbus on March 9, 1916. Edward Wyatt of the New York Times called boilerplate "Deliciously detailed." At one point even J. J. Abrams wanted to develop a project with the 1893 robot.

Seminars 
Paul Guinan and Anina Bennett are regulars of the comic con scene and often give seminars.  Bennett is also part of Friends of Lulu and the women's arts organization, Siren Nation. Both of which promote comic books to women and encourage women to enter the comic book industrial complex.

Multimedia work

Published Books
 - Total pages: 168 
 - Total pages: 96 
 Guinan, Paul; Bennett, Anina (2012). Boilerplate: History's Mechanical Marvel. Abrams. . -  Total pages:  168  
 Guinan, Paul; Bennett, Anina (2012). Frank Reade. Harry N. Abrams. . - Total pages: 176

Comic Con
Anina Bennett was an official guest of the following:
2011 San Diego Comic-Con
2013 Stumptown Comics Fest
2013 Kumoricon

External links
Aztec Empire Graphic novel created by Paul Guinan and Anina Bennett

Bibliography

Notes

References

 - Total pages: 472 
 

 - Total pages: 50 
 - Total pages: 168 

Living people
1965 births
American comics artists
Inkpot Award winners